Corporate Punishment Records (abbreviated CPR) is a Los Angeles-based independent record label. The company was formed in 2004 by Thom Hazaert and Eric Nielsen, also co-founders of Loudside.com and Total Assault Street Teams. The label's most prominent artists include David Reilly of God Lives Underwater, Trigger Point, Switched, Allele, Ghost Machine, and Amity Lane.

History

CPR was formed in 2004 by Thom Hazaert  and Eric Nielsen, who were also the co-founders of Loudside.com – a comprehensive music and entertainment site, and the Total Assault Street Teams. Their previous work with artists including Chimaira, Depswa, Switched, Korn, Limp Bizkit, Staind, The Used, Cold, Glassjaw, My Chemical Romance, Hed PE and Nine Inch Nails, amongst others, helped lay the foundation of the label.

Corporate Punishment was distributed by The Navarre Corporation in America, and Universal Music in Canada, until Navarre was purchased by E1/Koch, who became the label's distributor until 2008. After being released from their distribution deal with E1, the label went on hiatus until January 2010 when it was announced that Corporate Punishment had signed a Worldwide distribution deal with Trustkill Records. Shortly thereafter, it was announced the label went on hiatus, and Hazaert went on to form the INgrooves/Fontana distributed THC : MUSIC.

Roster

Current 

 3 Mile Scream
 Allele
 Amity Lane
 Broken Teeth
 Dangerous Toys
 Defiance
 Kïll Cheerleadër
 On A Pale Horse
 N3V3R 3N0U6H
 Onesidezero
 Pain Principle
 The Penny Royals
 Re:Ignition
 Tinjen
 Years of Fire
 Divided By Zero
 9mm Solution
 My Downfall
 Invent the Dark
 Victory Pill

Past 

 AM Conspiracy
 David Reilly
 KCUF
 Mastery
 Nobis
 Rikets
 Shenoah
 Ghost Machine
 Silent Civilian
 Sinkin' Ships
 Trigger Point
 Hydrovibe
 Switched

See also
 List of record labels

References

External links
 Official site

American independent record labels
Record labels established in 2004
Rock record labels
Alternative rock record labels